Shadowboxing 3: Last Round (literally "Fight with Shadow 3") is a 2011 Russian sports drama movie.

The film is a sequel to Shadowboxing from 2005 and Shadowboxing 2 from 2007.

Plot
After four years, boxer champion Artyom Kolchin has reached all conceivable peaks and became a national hero. He no longer appears in the ring, preferring coaching and a lively social life with constant appearances on television, parties and intrigues. At home during the mornings he is joined by his daughter Pauline and wife Vika, who no longer recognizes in him the Artyom with whom she once fell in love with. Vika begins to feel that she has fallen out of love with Artyom and leaves him.

Outwardly prosperous existence Kolchin comes to an end when his protegee Oleg is almost killed by the famous Philippines boxer Antonio Cuerte in battle. Artyom suspects that he uses some illegal drugs. For the evidence he has to go to Hong Kong, where his old acquaintance Vagit Valiev waits for him: he knows something about Cuerte what no one else knows. Valiev sends a mobile phone to Artyom which he uses to keep in contact with him, and invites him for a visit. But on arrival in Hong Kong, Artyom is arrested for smuggling drugs and then faces a murder attempt.

Having miraculously withstood and survived the persecution of the police and the mafia, Artyom meets Vagit. It turns out that Cuerte is a genetically modified person; result of experiments from a secret triad laboratory led by the mysterious Lee Ho. To obtain evidence, the protagonist, along with Vagit and his girlfriend Sun, goes into the jungle. He manages to find the laboratory and talk with its leader Professor Bastian.

After wanderings through the jungle, Artyom falls into the hands of the police, where he is brought back out by Colonel of FSKN Nechaev, who arrived in Hong Kong as part of a drug sting operation. To defeat the enemies Artyom has to return home, and then again enter the ring. In battle, Kolchin struggles and is using up his last strength. Cuerte is ready to kill him, but Artyom remembers that the Filipino is a mutant who has been implanted with a snake's genome, and a snake reacts only to movements. Kolchin raises his hand and Cuerte responds to the movement. He, in a jump, wants to hit Artyom with his fatal blow, but misses a crushing uppercut in the jaw and falls into a heavy knockout. Kolchin again becomes the champion. Right after the battle Artyom wants to slay the killer of the triads, but Nechayev arrests him. After that, world champion Artyom Kolchin offers Cuerte to tell him what the crazy doctor did to him. After the victory, Artyom receives the title of world champion, his wife Vika returns to him, and his pupil Oleg gets up from a wheelchair, inspired by the victory of Artyom. After some time, to Artyom's house comes a package containing a phone to which Vagit calls, who is already in Alaska together with Sun.

Cast
Denis Nikiforov as Artyom Kolchin
Yelena Panova as Vika
Andrey Panin as Valiyev
Pavel Derevyanko as Timokha
Batu Khasikov as Antonio Cuerte
Mikhail Gorevoy as Michael 
 Sofya Mitskevich as Polina
Yevgeni Ponasenkov as TV director

Production
Shadowboxing 3 was shot in 2D and converted in 3D in post-production.
The film was shot in Moscow, Hong Kong, Thailand and Norway.

References

External links 

2011 films
2010s Russian-language films
2000s action drama films
Russian action drama films
Films set in Moscow
Films shot in Moscow
Russian 3D films
Russian sequel films
2000s sports drama films
Russian sports drama films
Russian boxing films
Films shot in Thailand